Dardanelle is a city in northeast Yell County, Arkansas, United States. The population was 4,745 at the 2010 census. Along with Danville, it serves as a county seat for Yell County. It is located near Lake Dardanelle.

Dardanelle is part of the Russellville Micropolitan Statistical Area.

History 

Dardanelle is one of the oldest cities in the state of Arkansas. Officially incorporated in 1855, Dardanelle celebrated its 150th anniversary in 2005. However, the area had been settled for years before that, first being established as a river town in the mid-18th century. It is Yell County's dual county seat, sharing that title with Danville.

The Treaty of Council Oaks was signed on June 24, 1823 on what is now North Front Street beneath two huge oak trees (102 feet high and 400–500 years old). Under orders of President James Monroe, U.S. Army Colonel David Brearley and secretary of Arkansas Territory Robert Crittendon met with Black Fox and several Cherokee leaders to determine boundaries. As a result of the treaty, the Cherokees gave up all of their land in Arkansas south of the Arkansas River. One of the trees was destroyed in the early 1990s in a flood, but the other is still standing. The site is now a city park.

Because of its location on the banks of the Arkansas River, Dardanelle was one of Arkansas's leading towns in the 19th century. Hundreds of barges, steamboats, and other vessels traveled by the town annually. Approximately halfway between the state's two largest cities of Little Rock and Fort Smith, Dardanelle was a transportation and business hub, known as a marketplace for gin, rum and cotton.

Dardanelle has a history of being one of the state's leading immigration centers that continues to this day. Vast numbers of Czech and German families, including the Ballouns, Vodrazkas, Staneks, and Pfeiffers, came to the town in the late 18th and early 19th centuries, and their impact can still be felt. As of 2010, Dardanelle has one of the highest percentages of Hispanics in the state, with over 36% of the town's population Hispanic (up from 21% in 2000).

Merritt Park opened in the late 1990s on the west side of town. It is a large, state-of-the-art park featuring outstanding baseball facilities, a playground, soccer fields, basketball courts, and a walking/jogging trail. The adjacent Dardanelle Community Center opened around the same time, and provides multiple services for the community.

In the late 19th century, a pontoon bridge between Dardanelle and Russellville replaced ferry service. Spanning 2,208 feet, it was the longest pontoon bridge ever constructed across a moving body of water. The bridge was completely washed out multiple times during its nearly forty years of existence.

The Dardanelle Lock & Dam, constructed in the 1960s as a part of the McClellan-Kerr Navigation System, led to the formation of Lake Dardanelle. It is a source of hydropower, and helps regulate river traffic on the Arkansas River. In 2013 it had an operating budget just over 8.9 million dollars.

During the 2019 Arkansas River floods, a levee just south of Dardanelle near Holla Bend failed and broke at 1 a.m. Friday, May 31. Over the next few days water came perilously close to homes, schools and businesses in the southern part of Dardanelle but receded before causing any major damage.

Geography
Dardanelle is located at  (35.222539, -93.160408).

Demographics

2020 census

As of the 2020 United States census, there were 4,517 people, 1,609 households, and 1,066 families residing in the city.

2000 census
As of the census of 2000, there were 4,228 people, 1,605 households, and 1,078 families residing in the city. The racial makeup of the city was 75.24% White, 4.64% Black, 0.54% Native American, 0.43% Asian, 0.09% Pacific Islander, 16.65% from other races, and 2.41% from two or more races.  21.48% of the population were Hispanic or Latino of any race.

In the city, the population was spread out, with 25.4% under the age of 18, 9.9% from 18 to 24, 28.5% from 25 to 44, 19.7% from 45 to 64, and 16.5% who were 65 years of age or older.  The median age was 35 years. For every 100 females, there were 92.7 males.  For every 100 females age 18 and over, there were 86.6 males.

The median income for a household in the city was $25,727, and the median income for a family was $30,457. Males had a median income of $21,138 versus $17,370 for females. The per capita income for the city was $14,583.  About 14.9% of families and 19.6% of the population were below the poverty line, including 26.5% of those under age 18 and 14.0% of those age 65 or over.

According to 2010  Census results, the population of the area was approximately 4,745 people. From 2000 to 2010, the Dardanelle city population growth percentage was 12.2% (or from 4,228 people to 4,745 people). 28.7% of the Dardanelle city residents were under 18 years of age. Racial data for Dardanelle city include the breakdown percentages of  57.9% non-Latino White, 3.6% African American, 0.5% Asian and 36.1% Hispanic, with 1,346 of 1,745 Latino residents being of Mexican descent.

Also, there were 1,877 housing units in Dardanelle city, 89.5% of which were occupied housing units, with just over 50% of occupied units being those of homeowners. There were 1,680 households, out of which 39.7% had children under the age of 18 living with them, 42.4% were married couples living together, 15.8% had a female householder with no husband present, and 33.6% were non-families. 29.2% of all households were made up of individuals, and 27.6% had someone living alone who was 65 years of age or older.  The average household size was 2.74 and the average family size was 3.33.

Economy
After falling into decay for a number of years, Front Street, which borders the Arkansas River, is thriving once again. Daly's Downtown (now Front Street Grill), Savanah's Restaurant (now closed), and Millyn's Gift Store anchored this rejuvenation. A devastating fire on August 15, 2015 destroyed three historic buildings (including Millyn's) and badly damaged two others on the Southwest side of Front Street between Locust and Market streets. Three new buildings (including Millyn's) echoing the period architectural style of other commercial buildings along Front Street were constructed to replace them. Beautiful views of the river, historic buildings, shops and a variety of restaurants make Front Street one of the premier places to visit in the Arkansas River Valley. Other main commercial areas in the city include Union, Quay, and 2nd Streets.

Dardanelle is well known for its local restaurants. The Front Street Grill is a popular night spot specializing in American fare with live entertainment. A variety of Hispanic/Mexican restaurants, such as Tarasco's Mexican Restaurant on Front St., La Plaza Mexicana and El Parian on Union St., and Casa de Sol on Highway 7 South, showcase the city's vibrant Hispanic culture. Fowler's is a popular home-style restaurant on 2nd St. Dardanelle also includes fast food options such as Sonic, Shipley, Pizza Hut, Burger King, McDonalds, Taco Bell and Subway.

Some of Dardanelle's larger employers include Tyson Foods, Walmart Supercenter, The Dardanelle Nursing and Rehabilitation Center, Dardanelle School System, Dardanelle City Government and Chambers Bank, which acquired River Town Bank (formerly the Bank of Dardanelle) in 2019.

Dardanelle is home to the Dardanelle Post-Dispatch. Established in 1853, the newspaper claims to be the oldest weekly newspaper in Arkansas.

Arts and culture

Points of interest 
A number of attractions can be found in Dardanelle or its surrounding area, including:
 The Yell County Courthouse (on the National Register of Historic Places)
 Dardanelle Agriculture and Post Office
 Dardanelle Rock
 Highway 22, designated "True Grit Trail" by Governor Asa Hutchinson on March 20, 2019, is located at the western edge of Dardanelle.

Parks and recreation
 Lake Dardanelle
 Mount Nebo and Mount Nebo State Park
 Holla Bend National Wildlife Refuge
 Dana Merritt Park
 Veterans' Memorial Riverfront Park
 Council Oaks Park and Historic Site

Education

Public library 
The Arkansas River Valley Regional Library system is based in Dardanelle, which consists of one central library, located at 501 North Front Street, and six branch libraries in other communities, which provide area residents with access to print books, publications and multimedia content.

Public education 
Public elementary and secondary education is provided by Dardanelle School District that leads students to graduate at Dardanelle High School.

Transportation
The Dardanelle and Russellville Railroad, or "D&R" as it is known locally, is one of few remaining short-line railroads in the state. It connects Dardanelle with its larger neighbor on the north bank of the river. Highways 7, 22, 27, and 28 can be found ending or going through Dardanelle. Dardanelle is halfway between the Buffalo River to the north and Hot Springs to the south on Scenic Byway 7.

Sports
 The Lion's Den Golf Course

Notable people
 Bonnie Brown Ring, a member of the country music group the Browns. Born in Sparkman, Arkansas, she spent most of her adult life in Dardanelle.
 Jim R. Caldwell, born in Dardanelle in 1936, first Republican to serve in the Arkansas State Senate in the 20th century
 Johnny Carpenter, American film actor, screenwriter and producer
 Tom Cotton, Republican junior U.S. Senator from Arkansas
 John Daly, golfer, lived in Dardanelle as a child and currently owns a home near Dardanelle
 Orval Lee Jaggers, American Christian minister, writer, and scholar
 James Lee Witt, former director of the Federal Emergency Management Agency

See also 

 True Grit (novel), setting for the novel is a farm in the Dardanelle area.
 Arkansas Highway 22 which terminates in Dardanelle, was designated "True Grit Trail" by Governor Asa Hutchinson on March 20, 2019.

References

External links
 
 Dardanelle Chamber of Commerce
 City of Dardanelle Arkansas Portal style website, Government, Business, Library, Recreation and more
 City-Data.com Comprehensive Statistical Data and more about Dardanelle
 Encyclopedia of Arkansas Statistical Data and historical information about Dardanelle

 
1855 establishments in Arkansas
Cities in Arkansas
County seats in Arkansas
Populated places established in 1855
Cities in Yell County, Arkansas
Russellville, Arkansas micropolitan area
Arkansas populated places on the Arkansas River